Remacle may refer to:

 Saint Remacle (fl. 625–663), Benedictine missionary bishop of the 7th century
 Éric Remacle (1960–2013), Belgian political scientist
 Françoise Remacle, Belgian chemist
 Jordan Remacle (born 1987), Belgian footballer
 Louis Remacle (1910–1999), Belgian linguist